CCGS S. Dudka is fishery protection vessel of the Canadian Coast Guard.
She was built in Lunenberg, Nova Scotia, for $2.9 million CAD.
She was launched on March 22, 2013.
She was officially commissioned on July 11, 2013.
Twenty-five descendants of Stanley Dudka, the ship's namesake, attended the commissioning.
Dudka was a decorated veteran of World War II.

References

2013 ships
Ships built in Nova Scotia
Ships of the Canadian Coast Guard